Julie Halard-Decugis was the defending champion but did not compete that year.

Dominique Van Roost won in the final 6–3, 6–3 against Marianne Werdel-Witmeyer.

Seeds
A champion seed is indicated in bold text while text in italics indicates the round in which that seed was eliminated.

  Elena Likhovtseva (second round)
  Ruxandra Dragomir (first round)
  Linda Wild (first round)
  Barbara Schett (first round)
  Silvia Farina (first round)
  Shi-Ting Wang (quarterfinals)
  Florencia Labat (second round)
  Sabine Hack (second round)

Draw

External links
 1997 ANZ Tasmanian International Draw

Hobart International – Singles
Singles